Lavoisiera canastrensis is a critically endangered plant species that was found in 2017. It is only known to live in Brazil's Serra da Canastra National Park.  This area has been the only known mountaintop in Brazil as the location for the Lavoisiera species.  Overall, about 66% are endangered because of limited distributions and small population sizes. To protect the endangered species of Lavoisiera species, a global conservation area, named campo rupestre, is a long-term conservation between governmental and non-governmental agencies to expand, monitor, and support the species.

References

Endemic flora of Brazil
Melastomataceae